Dysschema perplexum is a moth of the family Erebidae first described by William Schaus in 1910. It is found in Panama and Costa Rica.

References

Moths described in 1910
Dysschema